Boussole (French "compass") may refer to:

La Boussole, French ship Boussole (1781)
Boussole Rock, Jukdo (island)
 Boussole Strait in the Kuril Islands
Boussole (fr), novel by Mathias Énard 2015 Prix Goncourt
La Boussole (fr), 1990s French rap group including Médine (rapper)